San José de Guanipa, also known as El Tigrito, is a city in the state of Anzoátegui, Venezuela. It is the capital of  Guanipa Municipality. Officially founded in 1910, it was previously a settlement of the Kali'na people.  El Tigrito lies between the larger town El Tigre and the oil camp of San Tomé.

Like the Guanipa River, the city is named for the Kali'na cacique Guanipa.

References

Cities in Anzoátegui
Populated places established in 1910